Amyloid cardiomyopathy (stiff heart syndrome) is a condition resulting in the death of part of the myocardium (heart muscle). It is associated with the systemic production and release of many amyloidogenic proteins, especially immunoglobulin light chain or transthyretin (TTR). It can be characterized by the extracellular deposition of amyloids, foldable proteins that stick together to build fibrils in the heart. The amyloid can be seen under polarized light in congo red stained biopsy.

Symptoms 
Amyloid cardiomyopathy is associated with a number of symptoms:
 diastolic dysfunction
 congestive heart failure
 arrythmia
 cardiac nervous conduction block
 fatigue
 dyspnea

Pathophysiology 
Amyloid proteins are deposited in the myocardium. This limits ventricular filling during diastole, which increases end-diastolic volume. This can lead to a variety of cardiac issues, such as congestive heart failure, atrial arrythmia, ventricular arrythmia, and blocks to cardiac nervous conduction.

Diagnosis 
Diagnosis is often delayed, because its symptoms are non-specific.

Electrocardiography can be used to identify low voltage and patterns similar to those of a heart attack.

Cardiac MRI can be used to distinguish it from hypertensive heart disease. This shows a thicker interventricular septum.

Treatment 
Chemotherapy can treat amyloidosis if it is related to immunoglobulins. Liver transplant can treat amyloidosis if it is related to familial transthyretin.

Prognosis 
Outcomes for amyloid cardiomyopathy are generally very poor, with fewer than 10% of patients surviving more than 5 years. Without treatment, few patients survive more than 6 months.

Epidemiology 
In developed countries, amyloid cardiomyopathy is estimated to be involved in 0.1% of deaths.

References

Cardiomyopathy